The Men's 100 metre freestyle competition of the 2018 European Aquatics Championships was held on 4 and 5 August 2018.

Records
Prior to the competition, the existing world and championship records were as follows.

Results

Heats
The heats were started on 4 August at 09:30.

Semifinals
The semifinals were held on 4 August at 17:24.

Semifinal 1

Semifinal 2

Final
The final was held on 5 August at 17:20.

References

Men's 100 metre freestyle